Gerhard Scheller (born 19 October 1958) is a German former cyclist. He competed in the sprint event at the 1984 Summer Olympics.

References

External links
 

1958 births
Living people
German male cyclists
Olympic cyclists of West Germany
Cyclists at the 1984 Summer Olympics
Sportspeople from Nuremberg
Cyclists from Bavaria